Thomas Novak (born April 28, 1997) is an American professional ice hockey forward currently playing with the  Nashville Predators of the National Hockey League (NHL). He was drafted with the 85th overall pick by the Predators in the third round of the 2015 NHL Entry Draft.

Playing career
After three years of high school hockey at Saint Thomas Academy, Novak joined the Waterloo Black Hawks for the 2014–15 USHL season. Novak's outstanding play with the Black Hawks was rewarded when he was invited to skate in the 2014 CCM/USA Hockey All-American Prospects Game.

Novak played the 2015–16 season with the University of Minnesota Golden Gophers. After his college career, he signed a one-year American Hockey League contract with the Milwaukee Admirals in 2019. He signed an entry level contract with Nashville on March 25, 2020, and played in his first NHL game on October 19, 2021.

International play
Novak helped lead Team USA to a bronze medal at the 2014 Ivan Hlinka Memorial Tournament, and he scored seven points in four games as a member of Team USA at the 2014 World Junior A Challenge.

Career statistics

Regular season and playoffs

International

Awards and honors

References

External links 

1997 births
Living people
American ice hockey players
Chicago Wolves players
Florida Everblades players
Milwaukee Admirals players
Nashville Predators draft picks
Nashville Predators players
USA Hockey National Team Development Program players
Waterloo Black Hawks players